Teksid S.p.A. is an Italian company based in Carmagnola which specialises in the production of iron and castings for the automotive industry. Originally known as Ferriere Piemontesi, Teksid is owned by Stellantis, and was owned by its predecessors Fiat Chrysler Automobiles (2014-2020) and Fiat S.p.A. (1978-2014). The company was renamed Teksid in January 1978.

In 1998, the French car manufacturer Renault merged its foundry business with Teksid, creating a change of ownership with a share 66.5%/33.5% to Fiat and Renault respectively. 
By 2013 Fiat grew its share to 84.8% and Renault retains 15.2%.

The company owns seven plants (four in Europe, and one each in South America, Central America and China), and employs 7,000 persons. Teksid produces engine blocks, cylinder heads, engine components, transmission parts, gearboxes and suspensions. In 2012 the company reported total revenues of €780 million, down 15% over 2011.

Teksid's products are used by various Stellantis companies, and also sold to third party companies including Cummins, Ford and General Motors.

The company was chaired by Sergio Marchionne and the subsidiary is managed at group level by COO Riccardo Tarantini, alongside fellow subsidiary Comau.

In December 2019, it was announced that Stellantis had agreed to sell Teksid's global cast iron automotive components business to Tupy S.A. The sale is expected to close in the second half of 2020. Teksid’s aluminum
business is not included in the transaction and will remain a strategic asset in Stellantis' portfolio.

Joint ventures
In China, Teksid has a 50% ownership of Hua Dong Teksid Automotive Foundry Co. Ltd.

References

External links

HD Teksid (Chinese JV)

Stellantis
Steel companies of Italy
Manufacturing companies established in 1978
Italian companies established in 1978
Italian brands